Juana de Jesús Sarmiento Ariza, better known as Juana de J. Sarmiento (1899-1979) was a Colombian politician and activist, recognized for having been the first elected mayor of a municipality in Colombia.

Early life and political career
Sarmiento was born in the municipality of Sabanalarga, Atlántico Department, in 1899. She began her political career by participating in the creation and organization of civic committees in the municipality. In the 1930s, she founded a women's organization called Colombia Democrática, also becoming its president. The establishment of this committee led to the creation of foundations which were led exclusively by women in the coffee-growing country.

In 1935, she was one of the founders of the  Sociedad de Mejoras Públicas de Sabanalarga. During the 1940s, she continued to lead activism campaigns for the benefit of her municipality and the rights of women and the underprivileged. In this way, she became a notable and respected citizen in Sabanalarga, consolidating her political career. On May 15, 1951, Sarmiento became the first elected mayor of a municipality in the entire history of Colombia.

In 1955, Sarmiento was appointed Secretary of the Administrative Council of the municipality. In one of her last civic endeavors, she was instrumental in building a nursing home in the 1970s.

Sarmiento died on May 25, 1979, at the age of 79.

References

1899 births
1979 deaths
Colombian politicians
Colombian activists
Women mayors of places in Colombia
Colombian women's rights activists